Zemiropsis demertziae is a species of sea snail, a marine gastropod mollusk, in the family Babyloniidae.

References

demertziae
Gastropods described in 2013